Hugues Absil (born 8 June 1961) is a French painter.

Biography 
Born in 1961 in Paris, Hugues Absil studied in the École nationale supérieure des Beaux-Arts. He learned painting and lithography with Abraham Hadad, and drawing with Daniel Sénélar (1990). He worked on Fernand Léger and Paul Klee. He has made several exhibitions since 1986.

Works

External links 
  Official website
 An article of l'ingénieur constructeur : here
 a biography

References 
The information in this article is based on that in its French equivalent.

20th-century French painters
20th-century French male artists
French male painters
21st-century French painters
21st-century French male artists
1961 births
Living people